Jayashelan Prasad (born 26 May 1988) is an Indian footballer who last played for Bharat FC.

Career

Pune
Jayashelan joined Pune F.C. during 2008. He was selected to play for the Pune FC senior team during the II-Division I-League campaign in 2008. When playing for Pune FC in his first year he announced his name by scoring against Sesa, Goa in Gurgaon. The goal was one of the three goals Pune FC scored in the tournament to make it to the I League from the Second Division.

Quartz Soccer Club
On 26 September 2012, it was announced that J.Prasad had signed for Quartz S.C. for the 2012 I-League 2nd Division.

References

External links
 Profile at Goal.com
 

1988 births
Footballers from Bangalore
Living people
I-League players
Pune FC players
Mohammedan SC (Kolkata) players
Bhawanipore FC players
Bharat FC players
Association football forwards
Indian footballers